Kasenyi may refer to one of the following:

 Kasenyi, Buliisa, a settlement in Buliisa District, Western Region, Uganda
 Kasenyi, Kasese, a settlement in Kasese District, Western Region, Uganda
 Kasenyi Airport, an airport in Kasese District, Uganda.